Dugalić is a Bosnian surname. Notable people with the surname include:

Ahmed-paša Dugalić (fl. 1598–1605), Ottoman Bosnian governor
Angela Dugalić (born 2001), Serbian basketball player
Esad Dugalić (1947–2011), Bosnian football goalkeeper
Nebojša Dugalić (born 1970), Serbian actor, theater director and drama professor
Rade Dugalić (born 1992), Serbian footballer

Bosnian surnames
Serbian surnames